Cherry Burton railway station was a railway station on the York to Beverley Line in the East Riding of Yorkshire, England. It opened on 1 May 1865 and served the village of Cherry Burton in the East Riding of Yorkshire, England. It closed on 5 January 1959.

References

External links
Station on navigable 1947 O.S. map

Disused railway stations in the East Riding of Yorkshire
Former North Eastern Railway (UK) stations
Railway stations in Great Britain opened in 1865
Railway stations in Great Britain closed in 1959